Kenya–Saudi Arabia relations are bilateral relations between Kenya and Saudi Arabia.

History
Relations between Saudi and Kenya are cordial. President Daniel arap Moi visited Saudi Arabia in 1979 and 1983. Foreign Minister Chirau Ali Mwakwere visited Saudi in 2005.   President Mwai Kibaki also visited Saudi Arabia in 2012.

Kenya is keen on boosting tea sales and increasing Saudi tourists to Kenya.

Development cooperation
Saudi Arabia, through the Saudi Fund for Development, has funded multiple development projects in Kenya. Some of which are Nairobi Water Supply SR 55.84 million, Kenya-South Sudan Road SR 34.59 million, Thika-Garissa-Liboi Road SR 55.84 million, Mombasa Sewage SR 45.95 million, Kiambere Hydro Electricity Power SR 39.96 million, Agriculture Sector Support SR 15 million and Garissa Water Supply SR 31.41million.

In 2011, Saudi approved KES.1.6 billion loan to Kenya for the construction of the 146km Nuno-Mado Gashi road that will run between Garissa and Mandera towns. Saudi also approved KES.1.2 billion to fund five power projects.

Saudi also hosts about 20,000 Kenyan professional and domestic workers.

Trade
In 2014, Kenyan imports from Saudi stood at KES. 28.22 billion (EUR. 265 billion).

In 2013, Kenyan imports from Saudi stood at KES. 64 billion (EUR. 603 million). Total trade between both countries stood at KES. 68 billion (EUR. 636 million). This made Saudi the 9th largest trading partner of Kenya.

Diplomatic missions
Saudi Arabia maintains an embassy in Nairobi. It is located in Muthaiga Road. Kenya has an embassy in Riyadh.

External links 
 Embassy of Saudi Arabia in Nairobi
 Embassy of Kenya in Riyadh

References

 
Bilateral relations of Saudi Arabia
Saudi Arabia